The Lutheran Educational Conference of North America (LECNA) is a consortium of Lutheran liberal arts colleges and universities.  
Formed in 1910, it is the oldest existing inter-Lutheran organization in the United States and Canada. 
LECNA's purpose is to encourage, assist, and promote cooperation among Lutheran colleges and universities in the United States and Canada.

Member Institutions 
The conference (or consortium) includes 40 member institutions:
 Augsburg University
 Augustana College (Illinois)
 Augustana University (South Dakota)
 Bethany College (Kansas)
 Capital University
 Carthage College
 California Lutheran University
 Concordia University College of Alberta
 Concordia University Texas
 Concordia College (Minnesota)
 Concordia College, Bronxville
 Concordia College, Selma
 Concordia University, Saint Paul
 Concordia University, Ann Arbor, Michigan
 Concordia University Chicago
 Concordia University (California)
 Concordia University, Nebraska
 Concordia University (Portland, Oregon)
 Concordia University Wisconsin
 Finlandia University
 Gettysburg College
 Gustavus Adolphus College
 Grand View University
 Lenoir-Rhyne College
 Luther College (Iowa)
 Luther College (Saskatchewan)
 Midland University
 Muhlenberg College
 Newberry College
 Pacific Lutheran University
 Roanoke College
 St. Olaf College
 Susquehanna University
 Thiel College
 Trinity Lutheran College (Washington)
 Texas Lutheran University
 Valparaiso University
 Wagner College
 Wartburg College
 Wittenberg University

External links
Official website

College and university associations and consortia in North America
Lutheran universities and colleges
1910 establishments in the United States